Crazy Love is a 2013 South Korean melodrama television series starring Park Sun-young, Go Se-won, Heo Tae-hee, Kim Yeon-joo, Kim Hae-in and Choi Dae-hoon. It aired on tvN from April 8 to September 17, 2013 on Mondays to Fridays at 21:45 (KST) time slot for 100 episodes.

Due to the drama's popularity, beginning July 22, 2013, its format was expanded from Mondays to Thursdays (four episodes a week), to Mondays to Fridays (five episodes a week).

Synopsis
Orphan Yoon Mi-so falls in love with Lee Min-jae, a rich heir. But what appeared to be a storybook ending with her prince turns into tragedy when Min-jae divorces her. Cast away like a used toy, Mi-so hits her all-time low. But after a life of abandonment and betrayal, she finds love again.

Cast
Main
Park Sun-young as Yoon Mi-so / Hong Eun-joo
Go Se-won as Seo Kyung-soo
Heo Tae-hee as Lee Min-jae
Kim Yeon-joo as Han Na-young / Lee Sun-hee
Kim Hae-in as Oh Hae-ryung
Choi Dae-hoon as Baek Jae-hyuk

Supporting
Yoo Hye-ri as Heo Myung-ja
Lee Hee-do as Oh Tae-san
Kim Young-ran as Go Yoo-jung
Lee Chae-mi as Lee Hae-ram, Mi-so's daughter
Jang Yoon-seo as Kim Jong-hee
Kang Seo-joon as Yoon Chan-ki
Maeng Sang-hoon as Yoon Moon-do
Kim Bun-young as Yoon Ji-mi
Oh Mi-hee as Jo Na-hyun
Choi Joon-young as Seo Kyung-min
Choi Min as Robert Jung
Min Joon-hyun

References

External links
 

TVN (South Korean TV channel) television dramas
2013 South Korean television series debuts
2013 South Korean television series endings
Korean-language television shows
South Korean melodrama television series
South Korean romance television series
Television series by JS Pictures